Christopher or Chris Crowe may refer to:

Chris Crowe (footballer) (1939–2003), English footballer
Chris Crowe (author), American academic and young-adult author
Christopher Crowe (screenwriter), screenwriter and television producer
Christopher Crowe (diplomat) (c. 1681–1749), English consul and landowner
Christopher Crowe,  one of several aliases used by Christian Gerhartsreiter (born 1961), German imposter and convicted murderer; this name was deliberately chosen to imitate the name of the Alfred Hitchcock Presents director